The Devon Mosaic: As Long as the Waters Flow is a 2007 mosaic by Mary Ann Moore, installed at the northwest corner of Oklahoma City, Oklahoma's Bricktown Canal, in the United States. The 1150-square-foot artwork was funded by Devon Energy as part of the state's centennial celebrations.

References

2007 works
Bricktown, Oklahoma City
Mosaics
Public art in Oklahoma